In a broad sense,   is an honorific for a spirit, especially one that causes hauntings, and the term is used as a synonym for . Later on, two more shrines were added, bringing the total to eight.

Description
The name consists of two kanji, 御 (go) meaning honorable and 霊 (ryō) meaning soul or spirit.

The belief that the spirits of those who died with resentment or anger after being treated unfairly caused hauntings existed before the Nara period (710–794). The first example is Prince Sawara, who was stripped of his position as crown prince and exiled to Awaji Island to die in 785.

Government official Sugawara no Michizane was killed in a plot by a rival member of the Fujiwara clan. In the years after his death, the capital city was struck by heavy rain and lightning, and his chief Fujiwara adversary and Emperor Daigo's crown prince died, while fires caused by lightning and floods destroyed many residences. The court drew the conclusion that the disturbances were caused by Michizane's . In order to placate him, the emperor restored all his offices, burned the official order of exile, and he was promoted to Senior Second Rank. Even this wasn't enough, and 70 years later he was elevated to the post of Daijō-daijin, and he was deified as Tenjin-sama, which means "heavenly deity". He became the patron god of calligraphy, of poetry and of those who suffer injustice. A shrine was established at Kitano. With the support of the government, it was immediately raised to the first rank of official shrines.

See also
 Emperor Sutoku
 Japanese folklore
 Onryō
 Taira no Masakado
 Yurei
 Yin miao
 The common end of myriad good deeds
 Ghosts in Chinese culture

Notes

References
 Iwasaka, Michiko and Toelken, Barre. Ghosts and the Japanese: Cultural Experiences in Japanese Death Legends, Utah State University Press, 1994.

External links
 The image of the Goryō for Japanese families
 Goryo Shinko - The Religion of Ghosts - An article about the Heian period Goryo religion at hyakumonogatari.com

Japanese ghosts
Japanese folk religion
Shinto
Onmyōdō

Goryō faith